James Bawtree (Jim) Webb, OBE (1929–2009) was influential in shaping Australia's international relations and overseas aid programs during the 1950s, 60s and 70s.

Family influences
His parents were Francis (Frank) and Gwendolyn Webb, who also had two daughters, Nancy, the older, and Elizabeth, the younger.
From his mother's side of the family Webb drew a strong Wesleyan Methodist background.  This contributed a major social justice streak to Webb's origins and to his lifelong views on politics and society.  From his mother and aunt he gained a love of language, enquiry and learning; and from his father extraordinary social and organisational skills. From 1929 to 1951 Webb lived at Kinkora Road, Hawthorn and attended the Auburn Methodist Church. From 1935 til 1942 he was a student at Spring Road Primary and Central Schools in Malvern. From 1943 to 1946 Webb  was a high school student at Melbourne Boys' High School.

Activism
By 1946 Webb was organiser of the Save Europe Now Campaign. In 1947 he completed a term at Melbourne University, and also took part in Methodist Youth Department Camps. In 1948 he became involved with the United Nations Appeal for Children and the UN Relief and Rehabilitation Administration, although he was also working as a paint salesman from 1947 through 1950. Webb studied accountancy at the Hemmingway Robertson Institute in 1949, and in 1950, while leaving on a trip to Calcutta and Oberammergau, he learned he had won a United Nations International Essay contest, entitling him to a fellowship to represent Australia at the yearly assemblies of the World Federation of United Nations Associations in Geneva and to study at the UN general assembly in New York. He and met international leaders including Eleanor Roosevelt. This experience changed his world view, including his faith. Webb continued his studies at Melbourne University (graduating with honors) and Queens College from 1951 until 1954. Meanwhile, he became secretary, then president, of the Melbourne University Student Representative Council. It was in 1952 that he received a UNESCO Grant to travel for three months studying aid and development in Asia. From 1953 to 1969 he was Honorary Secretary to the Volunteer Graduate Association for Indonesia, forerunner of the Overseas Service Bureau, now Australian Volunteers International. During 1954 Webb was a member of the Board of Union Theatre Company, International Vice–President of the National Union of Students, and president of the Sports & Social Club at Queens College.
A tutor in Political Science at Melbourne University from 1955–56, Webb helped establish the Australia-Indonesia Association and was chairman for the Australian Committee for the World University Service. While Warden of Union House at Melbourne University (1956–63), Webb and his family lived on campus in Tin Alley. In 1957 Webb was foundation committee member of the information group 'Aboriginal Affairs'. From 1958 to 1969 he was a national committee member for Community Aid Abroad.
In 1959 and 1960 Webb travelled to Europe and the US researching student unions and housing for Melbourne and Monash Universities, and during the latter year he founded the Overseas Service Bureau (now Australian Volunteers International) to encourage and support Australian international volunteers. (Webb was to become the full-time director of the Overseas Service Bureau from 1963 until 1969). In 1965 he was involved in establishing the Australian Council for Overseas Aid, now Australian Council for International Development, the Australian non–government aid sector’s peak body. After leaving the Overseas Service Bureau, Webb was director of the Social and Cultural Division, Asian and Pacific Council (ASPAC) Cultural and Social Centre for the Asia and Pacific Region, Seoul, until 1970, the same year he was awarded
his Officer of the Order of the British Empire for services to International Affairs. From 1970 to 1975 he was director of Community Aid Abroad (now Oxfam Australia). In 1972 he published Towards Survival: A programme for Australia’s overseas aid. In 1975 Webb initiated Citizens for Democracy during the 1975 Australian election campaign.

Personal life
Webb wed Lesley Merele Hayes in 1956, which union lasted until 1979. In 1958 his first child, Richard James Bawtree Webb was born. By 1960 another son, Geoffrey Ian, arrived. Catherine Dilys, the first daughter, was born in 1964. Webb helped Merele to establish Nillumbik Bushscape (a landscaping business) in 1976, and she still runs it.
That same year, Webb was hospitalised, as he  suffered a long period of serious depression culminating in hospitalisation for bipolar disorder. This undermined his self–confidence, and he largely withdrew from public life from then on. Even so, he was manager for the Nursing Mothers Association from 1977 to 1978.
In 1984 Webb married Marie Scott, and the next year he was a consultant for the Australian Schizophrenia Association. In the 1990s he was chair,  then member of the Corinella Park Committee. But in 1997, Webb was hospitalised with acute goitre, and spent 10 days in intensive care, the start of twelve years of debilitating ill–health. Despite this, in 2009 he celebrated his 80th Birthday and 25th Wedding anniversary, and on 20 July 2009, Webb died peacefully in his sleep.

The beneficiaries of volunteerism

Webb always maintained that the volunteers who went to Asia, Africa and the Pacific contributed far more to Australian society than they did to their host countries.

Awards
Officer of the Order of the British Empire (1970).

References

Australian humanitarians
2009 deaths
1929 births
People educated at Melbourne High School
People from Hawthorn, Victoria
Activists from Melbourne